Luis Felipe Landáez Requena (17 August 1931, Higuerote, Venezuela – 16 November 2008, Peñalolén, Santiago, Chile) was a Venezuelan-Chilean cumbia singer who was popular in Chile for his songs "La piragua" and "Macondo".

Biography

Early life and career 
Born in Higuerote on 17 August 1931, Landáez moved to Caracas when he was little. As a young man, he worked in his family's mechanical workshop, while at night he worked on music. On 8 August 1953, he won a song contest in Caracas with a song called "Billos Busca Sintantes", which served as a springboard to professionally dedicating himself to singing. He began his professional career at the age of 21, as a crooner of different orchestras: Manuel Ramos, Casablanca, Caracas Swing Boys and Arnoldo Nali. After participating in some musical groups, such as Billo's Caracas Boys and Luis Alfonzo Larrain's Orchestra, he began his solo career at the end of the 1950s.

As a soloist 
In 1960, Landáez toured Colombia, Ecuador, Peru, and Chile. The latter arrived on May 30, 1962 and joined the tour of many nueva ola artists. He eventually decided to settle in Chile and became a musical icon, recording 45 cumbia albums. He decided to return to Chile in 1974, where he married for the second time Alicia Vera, a young officer of Carabineros, who came from Santiago; they had four sons, Luis Felipe, Pedro, Pablo and Juan. In 1975, he left for Caracas to enter a new stage of his career playing bolero, alternating his labor commitments between Venezuela and Chile. In the early 90s, Landáez re-acquired relevance when he was invited to participate in a new version of his classic "(Los Cien Años de) Macondo", made by the group Sexual Democracia. The rejuvenated song was very well received. After the breakup of his last marriage in 2000, Landáez settled in Chile, performing until 2004.

Controversy with Tommy Rey 
In December 2004, he accused  of cheapening the profession of singing by charging $500,000 per show. The lead singer, Patricio Zúñiga (professionally known as ), responded to these criticisms by describing Landáez as an "envious old fool".

Death 
On 16 November 2008, after staying two weeks in the Hospital Doctor Luis Tisné in Peñalolén, Landáez died at the age of 77 from cardiac arrest. During his life, he married five times and had 13 children. At the time of death, he also suffered from diabetes and kidney problems. His body was veiled in the Parish of La Asunción, and on 18 November, he was buried in the Mausoleum of the Artists, located in the Cementerio General de Santiago.

See also 
 Cumbia

References 

1931 births
2008 deaths
People from Miranda (state)
Chilean cumbia
Venezuelan emigrants to Chile
20th-century Venezuelan  male  singers
21st-century Chilean  male singers